Hot R&B/Hip-Hop Songs is a chart published by Billboard that ranks the top-performing songs in the United States in African-American-oriented musical genres; the chart has undergone various name changes since its launch in 1942 to reflect the evolution of such genres.  In 1985, the chart was published under the title Hot Black Singles.  During the year, 21 different singles topped the chart, based on playlists submitted by radio stations and surveys of retail sales outlets.

In the issue of Billboard dated January 5, Midnight Star was at number one with "Operator", the song's third week atop the chart.  The track ultimately spent five weeks in the top spot, but would prove to be the group's only chart-topper.  It was replaced at number one by "Gotta Get You Home Tonight" by Eugene Wilde, who reached the peak position with his first single to enter the chart.  
Seven other acts reached number one for the first time during the year: Maze featuring Frankie Beverly with "Back in Stride" in April, USA For Africa with "We Are the World" and Whitney Houston with "You Give Good Love" in May, Freddie Jackson with "Rock Me Tonight (For Old Times Sake)" in June, both Loose Ends with "Hangin' on a String (Contemplating)" and René & Angela with "Save Your Love (For #1)" in July, and Ready for the World with "Oh Sheila" in September.  Both Houston and Jackson achieved a second chart-topper before the end of the year. Additionally, the trio Isley-Jasper-Isley had their first chart topper under that name with "Caravan of Love", having previously spent time at number one as part of the Isley Brothers.  Supergroup USA for Africa's "We Are the World", a charity single intended to relieve starving people in Africa, particularly those feeling the effects of a lengthy famine in Ethiopia, became the fastest-selling American pop single in history and dominated radio airplay.  As a result, it topped the Hot 100, Hot Adult Contemporary, Hot Black Singles, and Hot Dance/Disco 12 Inch Singles Sales charts.  Houston's "Saving All My Love for You", Ready for the World's "Oh Sheila" and Stevie Wonder's "Part-Time Lover" also topped both the Black Singles chart and the Hot 100.

In addition to Houston and Jackson, Wilde, and Kool & the Gang were the only artists to have multiple number ones during 1985.  Jackson's "Rock Me Tonight (For Old Times Sake)" tied with "Part-Time Lover" by Wonder for 1985's longest run in the peak position at six weeks each; Jackson's total of eight weeks at number one was the most of any act.  In August, Aretha Franklin's "Freeway of Love" became her twentieth chart-topper, extending her record as the artist with the most number ones on the listing; it would prove to be her final appearance atop the chart, 18 years after her first.  Another all-time great who topped the chart for the final time was Diana Ross, who spent three weeks at number one with "Missing You", a tribute to singer Marvin Gaye, who had died the previous year.  Ross had first topped the chart as one of the Supremes in 1964.  The final number one of 1985 was Wilde's "Don't Say No Tonight"; although Wilde gained two number ones in 1985, he would achieve no further chart-toppers in his career.

Chart history

See also
List of Billboard Hot 100 number-one singles of 1985

References

Works cited

1985
1985 record charts
1985 in American music